The Farrah Fawcett red swimsuit poster shows a photograph of the American model and actress Farrah Fawcett taken by the American photographer Bruce McBroom in 1976. It was commissioned by the Pro Arts poster company, which published it as a pin-up poster the same year. With more than twelve million copies sold, it is considered the best-selling poster to date and is said to be a modern icon and a symbol of the late 1970s.

The photograph shows Farrah Fawcett, then aged 29, wearing a plain one-piece red swimsuit in front of a striped Mexican sarape as the only background. The swimsuit's color is sometimes described as reddish orange.

Creation and publication 

The photograph was created in mid-1976 as a commissioned work for the Pro Arts poster company. Ted Trikilis ran the business with his brother and his uncle. According to him, a friend brought Fawcett to his attention in April 1976. She was still unknown, doing commercials for hair shampoo. The friend and fellow students regarded her as the most beautiful woman on US television. Since there were no posters of her, they clipped shampoo ads from newspapers to hang them on their walls.

Pro Arts made an agreement with Fawcett, giving her control over the selection of the photos. After she was dissatisfied with the work of two photographers, she suggested Bruce McBroom, with whom she had worked before. The photograph was taken at Fawcett's estate in Los Angeles, where she was living with her partner Lee Majors. The swimsuit, a creation of designer Norma Kamali, was her own, and she also did her styling herself. The striped blanket in the background of the photo belonged to McBroom, who used it as a cover for his car seats. McBroom took several shots that day, and Fawcett chose two, including the one later published as a poster.

The poster was launched in 1976. That same year, Fawcett became popular through her role in the TV series Charlie's Angels. The poster became a great success, selling six million copies the first year. With more than twelve million sold copies, it is considered the best-selling poster to date.

Analysis 
In 2003, the communication scientist Chadwick Roberts published an essay about the Fawcett poster and its significance for social developments in the United States. He noted a change in feminine beauty ideal. Compared to the pin-up photographs of the 1940s, Fawcett's hips were narrow and her breasts were small. While the models of the 1940s had button noses, her nose was long, thin and prominent. In comparison with Mae West and Marilyn Monroe, for example, Fawcett showed a restrained way of being sexy. Fawcett's abundant unbound hair was a contrast to the androgynous style of the late 1960s and early 1970s. According to Roberts, she thus represented a new style of the all-American girl; and the presentation of her nipples and the inner part of her thigh, which was avoided in the 1940s, indicates a change in morality in the United States.

Roberts also noted a difference between Fawcett and Monroe in the way their star images were created. While Monroe's were made by men, Fawcett was in control of her image.

Legacy 
The poster was used in the 1977 film Saturday Night Fever, hanging in the room of Tony Manero next to a picture of Al Pacino. The poster also features in the 1997 film Boogie Nights, which is set in the 1970s.

In 2011, the Mattel toy manufacturing company published a Barbie collector's doll which re-enacts the poster. The same year, Fawcett's family donated several objects from the property of the actress, who had died in 2009, to the National Museum of American History of the Smithsonian Institution. Among them were a copy of the poster, the swimsuit, and a puzzle showing the photo. The items have since been exhibited in the museum's Division of Culture and the Arts.

The poster was subject of several court cases. Pro Arts sued the Campus Craft Holdings from Alberta, Canada, which sold over 90,000 copies of the poster without permission. In 1980, the Ontario High Court of Justice fined the company over 270,000 Canadian dollars. Campus Craft Holdings appealed this judgement but withdrew the appeal after paying an amount less than the judgement. A lawsuit against Hustler was lost by Pro Arts. The erotic magazine had published an advertisement showing the Fawcett poster in the background. The United States Court of Appeals for the Sixth Circuit decided that this usage was a fair use, as the poster's size was small in total and in comparison to the advertisement's size. Furthermore, it said that the advertisement had no negative effect on the market or the value of the poster.

References

Bibliography

External links 
 Farrah Fawcett – Swimsuit Poster in The Famous Pictures Collection

Color photographs
1970s photographs
1976 in art
Posters
Pin-up art
Photographs of the United States
Women in art